Richard Harris (born 26 March 1934) is a London- born British screenwriter and playwright, most active from the early 1960s to the mid-1990s. He wrote primarily for the crime and detective genres, having contributed episodes of series such as The Avengers, The Saint, The Sweeney, Armchair Mystery Theatre, and Target.  He has helped to create several programmes of the genre, including Adam Adamant Lives!,<ref>"Adam Adamant Lives! (1966-67)", BFI Screenonline.</ref> Man in a Suitcase, and Shoestring.    

Despite a career that has been largely spent writing for the crime and detective genre, in 1994 he won the prize for best situation comedy from the  Writers' Guild of Great Britain for Outside Edge, a programme he had originated as a stage play.Outside Edge, bbc.co.uk. Accessed 19 January 2023. Although the majority of his work has been for television, a substantial amount of his output has been for the stage.

Career

Harris began writing freelance episodes for British television in his mid-twenties.  His first sale was to Sydney Newman's 1960 ITV series, Police Surgeon, for which he wrote the final episode, "The Bigger They Are". Although he wrote for the initial runs of The Avengers and The Saint, much of the early 1960s was dominated by his contributions to anthological mystery programmes like The Edgar Wallace Mystery Theatre. His attempts at comedy in the early 1960s, largely collaborative efforts with Dennis Spooner, including an episode of Tony Hancock's unsuccessful 1963 series for ATV, failed to establish either writer in the genre. According to Mark Lewisohn, their two failed pilots for Comedy Playhouse proved the two men were really more interested in writing dramatic works. 

Despite his commercial failures with Spooner, he continued to collaborate with others during his early career, including Adam Adamant Lives! (1966), whose pilot he wrote with Donald Cotton. By the end of the decade, he had contributed individual episodes to 20 series. From the late 1960s onward, producers began allowing him to write a number of "first episodes", effectively making him co-creator of a number of projects like The Gamblers and Life and Death of Penelope. Despite having turned a number of ideas into initial scripts, however, he only occasionally received on-screen credit as co-creator. This pattern is evident in two of his later shows, both adapted from literature. On The Last Detective, he is recognised as having "devised the series for television". On A Touch of Frost, he is not, despite having written the entirety of the programme's first season.Seasonal credit list for A Touch of Frost,  epguides.com. Accessed 19 January 2023.  

Beginning around 1971, Harris turned his earlier comedic ambitions towards the stage.  The majority of his comedic work, even if it later ended up film, derives from his career as a theatre dramatist. Throughout the 1970s, a new play of his would be produced almost annually. Though the frequency of his stage work slowed in later decades, his plays continued to debut into the early part of the 21st century.   

While the majority of his career has been spent as a freelancer, he has been an occasional script editor, with shows such as Hazell. 

He is an intermittent radio dramatist, and won the Giles Cooper Award for adapting his television script Is It Something I Said? in 1978. One of his plays, Stepping Out,The New York Times has appeared in three different versions, ultimately allowing him the opportunity of a musical film adaptation released in 1991.

Harris has taken a number of literary characters and adapted them into ongoing series. The longest running of these are A Touch of Frost and The Last Detective, but he has also converted works including Mark Twain's The Prince and the Pauper into limited-run serials. He has also converted non-English sources into English drama, including his play, The Last Laugh, which derives from a Japanese work, and his adaptation of a Norwegian source into the dual-language film, Orions belte''. The latter won the inaugural Amanda for Best Norwegian Film in 1985.  

Because Harris is a near contemporary of the Irish actor Richard St. John Harris, his writing credits are sometimes erroneously ascribed.

Writing credits

Awards and nominations

References

External links

BBC – Comedy Guide – Richard Harris
The Playwrights Database – Richard Harris

1934 births
Living people
English television writers
Writers from London